Vizier's fingers, is a type of Turkish dessert. Ingredients include semolina, milk, egg, caster sugar, water, lemon juice, almond essence, butter, and rose water. The dessert reveals sexual imaginations just like other Turkish desserts such as Hanımgöbeği (lady's navel), Dilber Dudağı (lady lips), Kerhane Tatlısı (brothel dessert), Sütlü Nuriye (Milky Nuriye) etc.

See also
Şekerpare
Revani
Baklava
Tulumba

References

Turkish desserts